Marie-Rose Armesto (1960 – January 23, 2007) was a Spanish-born Belgian journalist. She was associate editor-in-chief for the Belgian television chain RTL-TVI.

She was born in Saviñao in Galicia and came to Belgium at the age of eight. She first worked in broadcasting in 1982 on the Radio Contact radio station. Armesto joined RTL-TVI in September 1987, eventually becoming head reporter for the chain in partnership with Jean-Pierre Martin; the pair married in 1984.

Not content to simply report the news, she organized a human chain around the Berlaymont building in Brussels to call attention to ethnic cleansing in Bosnia. She showed the Belgian public the plight of the missing in Chile and the victims of genocide in Rwanda. Armesto saw terrorism which claims Islam for its inspiration as the new fascism.

In 2002, she published Son mari a tué Massoud based on an interview with the wife of one of the assassins of Ahmad Shah Massoud.

Armesto died of cancer at the age of 46.

References 

1960 births
2007 deaths
Belgian radio journalists
Belgian writers in French
Belgian women journalists
Belgian women radio journalists
Spanish emigrants to Belgium
People from Terra de Lemos
20th-century Belgian journalists
21st-century Belgian journalists
Belgian television journalists
Belgian women television journalists